Václav Pavkovič (24 April 1936 in Břeclav – 17 November 2019) was a Czech rower who competed for Czechoslovakia in the 1960 Summer Olympics when he was a crew member of the Czechoslovak boat which won the bronze medal in the eights event.

References

External links
 profile

1936 births
2019 deaths
Czech male rowers
Czechoslovak male rowers
Olympic rowers of Czechoslovakia
Rowers at the 1960 Summer Olympics
Olympic bronze medalists for Czechoslovakia
Olympic medalists in rowing
Medalists at the 1960 Summer Olympics
People from Břeclav
Sportspeople from the South Moravian Region